Ruth McKay (born 2 August 1986) is a New Zealand female rugby union player. She was a member of the 2010 Women's Rugby World Cup winning squad.

McKay is a shepherd in Hunterville, New Zealand.

References

External links
Black Ferns Profile

1986 births
Living people
New Zealand women's international rugby union players
New Zealand female rugby union players
Rugby union props
Manawatu rugby union players